The Pirates Who Don't Do Anything: A VeggieTales Movie is a 2008 American computer-animated family adventure comedy film directed by Mike Nawrocki, written by Phil Vischer, produced by Big Idea and distributed by Universal Pictures. It is the second theatrical film to feature characters from the VeggieTales video series following Jonah: A VeggieTales Movie in 2002, and is the only VeggieTales media that deviates from its usual messages about Christianity and biblical morals.

The film was released in theaters on January 11, 2008, and received mixed reviews from critics, who criticized the script but praised the animation. The film was also a box office bomb, grossing only $13 million worldwide on a $15 million budget.

Plot 

In the past, the pirate Robert the Terrible attacks and boards one of the Kingdom of Monterria's ships, capturing Prince Alexander. Eluding the pirates, Princess Eloise and her servant Willory (played by Archibald Asparagus) send a device that the king made, called a "Helpseeker," to find heroes to save Alexander.

In modern times, three misfits: the "yes man" George (Pa Grape), the lazy Sedgewick (Mr. Lunt), and the timid Elliot (Larry the Cucumber) are employees at a dinner theater. Although they want to be seen as heroes by their loved ones, as lowly cabin boys they think their dream is unattainable. After wrecking the show one night, they are fired and thrown into an alley. The Helpseeker locates them and, after Elliot activates the device, transports the trio to Monterria.

Meeting the Princess and Willory, the group sets off to Jolly Joe's Tavern where they learn that Pirate Robert, the brother of the king before being banished, has kidnapped Alexander in the hopes of exacting revenge on the king. Setting sail in search of the whereabouts of Robert's hideout, the pirate's men capture Eloise and Willory. As George and Elliot continue on their quest, a cowardly Sedgewick decides to stay behind in a cave filled with "cheese curls". After the two leave, Sedgewick discovers the curls are instead living worm-like creatures which chase him out of the cave, forcing him to overcome his fear and laziness.

Meanwhile, George and Elliot arrive on an island populated by a rock giant family, who help them make it to Robert's fortress. Sedgewick meets up with them, having swum the ocean being chased by the living worm-like creatures. Arriving at a hidden bay outside of the fortress, the trio are attacked by a giant serpent. However, Elliot realizes the guardian is actually a mechanical device and is able to shut the machine down from inside and save the two. Once inside, George, Sedgewick, and Elliot rescue the prince and princess but are confronted by Robert who demands to know when the king is coming back. With no other choice, George, Sedgewick, and Elliot admit that they are "only cabin boys," and not heroes. But, suddenly, finding his self-respect, George uses a chandelier to knock the pirate down and the group escapes through the fortress's cistern with Robert in hot pursuit. Back in the bay, Robert's ship opens fire on the group's small boat. The king arrives, sinks Robert's ship, and rescues the group.

After receiving medals from the king and being declared heroes, the Helpseeker returns Elliot, George, and Sedgewick to the restaurant. Unbeknownst to them, Robert has stowed away on their trip back to get revenge on them for defeating him and attacks the dinner theater set and mistakes Sir Frederick (Jimmy Gourd), one of the stage performers, for George. In a final showdown, the trio defeat Robert and send him back to his own time. The audience cheer wildly as the gang earn the respect they had desired. Offered a second chance to be in the show, the three refuse and leave to pursue adventure elsewhere one more time as the Helpseeker blinks once again. The film ends with the entire cast singing "Rock Monster", a parody of The B-52's' hit "Rock Lobster". Once they are done singing, Bob the Tomato finally makes his appearance, as the director. Later, Robert is arrested by the King for his crimes as he is shown dancing to the music during the credits along with his imprisoned minions.

Voice cast 
 Phil Vischer as George (Pa Grape), Sedgewick (Mr. Lunt), Willory (Archibald Asparagus), Mr. Hibbing (Mr. Nezzer), Sir Frederick (Jimmy Gourd), Stede (Scallion #1), Phillipe Pea and Bob the Tomato
 Mike Nawrocki as Elliot (Larry the Cucumber), Bonnet, Darnell, Jean-Claude Pea and Barbossa
 Laura Gerow as Princess Eloise
 Yuri Lowenthal as Prince Alexander
 Cam Clarke as Robert the Terrible and King Cole
 Tim Hodge as Jolly Joe (Charlie Pincher) and the Ship Officer
 Megan Murphy as Bluvridge (Madame Blueberry)
 Alan Lee as a Blind Man and One-Eyed Louie
 Cydney Trent as Bernadette (Petunia Rhubarb)
 Keri Pisapia as Ellen
 Sondra Morton Chaffin as Caroline
 Drake Lyle as George Jr.
 Ally Nawrocki as Lucy
 Jim Poole as Scooter
 Patrick Kramer as Colin
 Joe Spadaford as Jacob Lewis

Production 

Phil Vischer completed the script for this film in 2002, noting that he wrote it before Pirates of the Caribbean: The Curse of the Black Pearl (2003) was released. But because of the bankruptcy and buyout of assets of Big Idea Productions, the film wasn't able to start production until late 2005.

The animation was done by Big Idea, Inc. in Nashville, Tennessee, Animation Production by Starz Animation in Toronto, Canada.

Reception 

According to the review aggregator website Rotten Tomatoes, 43% of critics have given the film a positive review based on 35 reviews, with an average rating of 4.92/10. The site's critics consensus reads, "This Veggietale should please the youngest crowds, but the silly script will tire the more discerning viewer." At Metacritic, the film has a weighted average score of 49 out of 100 based on 13 critics, indicating "mixed or average reviews". The film earned $12.7 million for Universal Studios out of an estimated $15 million budget.

Home media

The film was released on DVD on October 14, 2008.

Music 

Several original songs are performed in the film by the characters. In addition when the credits are paused, "The Pirates Who Don't Do Anything" (sung by Relient K) and "Rock Monster" (sung by the cast) can be heard.

References

External links 

 
 
 
 

2008 films
2000s American animated films
2000s children's animated films
2008 animated films
2008 computer-animated films
American children's animated adventure films
American children's animated comedy films
American children's animated fantasy films
American children's animated musical films
American fantasy adventure films
Big Idea Entertainment films
Films about Christianity
Christian animation
Films based on songs
Films set in the 17th century
Pirate films
Universal Pictures films
Universal Pictures animated films
VeggieTales films
American computer-animated films
2000s English-language films